The Serial: A Year in the Life of Marin County (often referred to as The Serial) is  a satirical novel about Marin County, California, written by Cyra McFadden. Beginning in 1976, the book's chapters had been serialized in the Marin County alternative weekly newspaper Pacific Sun, as well as the San Francisco Chronicle. It was first published in book form in 1977.

The book deals with life in mid-1970s Marin County, a suburban and affluent county just north of San Francisco.

The book was popular at the time of its initial publication. It has since been out of print for several years in the United States. It was reprinted in the United Kingdom by Prion Humour Classics in 2000 and as an apostrophebooks.com e-book in 2013.

A film version of the book, called Serial, was released in 1980 and starred Martin Mull and Tuesday Weld. It was received with limited critical praise.

Plot summary

The Serial is divided into 52 short chapters. It chronicles the lives of a group of residents of Marin County, mostly in their mid-to-late 30s and early 40s. The plot revolves around Harvey and Kate Holroyd, a couple in the midst of the mid-1970s Marin County lifestyle who are undergoing marital problems, with many other characters introduced in the book.

Analysis
The period of the storyline covers a time between the heyday of the 1960s counterculture and the culture loosely described as "Yuppie". There are elements of soap opera in the book, although the tone is comedic (specifically, satirical) rather than tragic. The novel describes its characters' lifestyles, including their interest in various New Age beliefs and human potential movement groups (including est, transcendental meditation, consciousness-raising, and rebirthing); their unconventional and arguably lax child-rearing techniques; and their embrace of a number of then-current fads, such as fern bars, jogging, and organic food. Wife swapping and open marriage are common as are cocaine use and frequent divorces.  Many things associated with the human potential movement are mentioned and satirized, including est, the Fischer-Hoffman Process, and Jonathan Livingston Seagull; radical feminism and Sierra Club membership are seemingly ubiquitous; and kids are sent to free-form summer camps offering survival training and "spontaneous rap sessions". The book satirizes many of the elements of a particular mid-to-late 1970s subculture, also described to some degree by author Tom Wolfe in his 1976 non-fiction essay "The Me Decade and the Third Great Awakening", particularly as manifested in the lives of people then between the ages of about 30 and 45 in affluent parts of California.

Many of the characters in The Serial also speak a particular jargon or lexicon, saying words and phrases like "flash on" (a phrasal verb meaning "to have a sudden insight about", as in "I really flashed on that"), "Really" (to signify assent), and others.

The Serial contains a great number of specific references to actual locations (restaurants, stores, streets) in 1970s Marin County. In the original Pacific Sun weekly chapters, black-and-white illustrations by Tom Cervenak accompany the text. These illustrations were included in the original edition of the book and in the first paperback edition of the book.

Reviews

See also 
I Want It All Now!

References

External links 
The Serial: A Year in Marin County  by Cyra McFadden | Apostrophe Books

1977 American novels
American novels adapted into films
Satirical novels
Marin County, California
Novels set in California
Novels first published in serial form
Works originally published in American magazines
New Age in popular culture